In mathematics, particularly in formal algebra, an indeterminate is a symbol that is treated as a variable, but does not stand for anything else except itself. It may be used as a placeholder in objects such as polynomials and formal power series. In particular:

 It does not designate a constant or a parameter of the problem.
 It is not an unknown that could be solved for.
 It is not a variable designating a function argument, or a variable being summed or integrated over.
 It is not any type of bound variable.
 It is just a symbol used in an entirely formal way.

When used as placeholders, a common operation is to substitute mathematical expressions (of an appropriate type) for the indeterminates.

By a common abuse of language, mathematical texts may not clearly distinguish indeterminates from ordinary variables.

Polynomials

Two such polynomials are equal only if the corresponding coefficients are equal.

For example, the functions

are equal when  and not equal otherwise. But the two polynomials

are unequal, since 2 does not equal 5, and 3 does not equal 2. In fact,

This is because  is not, and does not designate, a number.

But the distinction is important because information may be lost when this substitution is made. For example, when working in modulo 2, we have that:

so the polynomial function  is identically equal to 0 for  having any value in the modulo-2 system. However, the polynomial  is not the zero polynomial, since the coefficients, 0, 1 and −1, respectively, are not all zero.

Formal power series

A formal power series in an indeterminate  is an expression of the form , where no value is assigned to the symbol . This is similar to the definition of a polynomial, except that an infinite number of the coefficients may be nonzero. Unlike the power series encountered in calculus, questions of convergence are irrelevant (since there is no function at play).

As generators

Indeterminates are useful in abstract algebra for generating mathematical structures.

Indeterminates may also be used to generate a free algebra over a commutative ring .

See also
Indeterminate equation
Indeterminate form
Indeterminate system
Polynomial
Formal power series

Notes

References

 

Abstract algebra
Polynomials
Mathematical series